Legg Mason was an American investment management and asset management firm headquartered in Baltimore, founded in 1899 and acquired by Franklin Templeton Investments as of July 2020. As of December 31, 2019, the company had $730.8 billion in assets under management, including $161.2 billion in equity assets, $420.2 billion in fixed income assets, $74.3 billion in alternative assets, and $75.1 billion in liquidity assets.

History
In 1899, George Mackubin & Co., predecessor to Legg & Co., was founded in Baltimore, Maryland. It got its start selling stocks out of a back office in the Baltimore Stock Exchange in 1899. In 1970, it had offices in San Francisco, New York, as well as several in Maryland, with over 400 employees. It was best known for its expertise in the life and casualty insurance industry.

In 1949, after the departure of Mackubin, John C. Legg, Jr. named the company after himself.

In 1962, Mason & Co., a stockbrokerage, was founded by Raymond A. “Chip” Mason in Newport News, Virginia.

In 1967, Mason & Co., with over 80 employees in 4 offices, became one of the largest Virginia-based stockbrokerages.

In 1970, Mason & Co. was acquired by Legg & Co., forming Legg Mason & Co., Inc., with  headquarters in Baltimore, Maryland.

In 1975, Raymond A. Mason became chairman and CEO, adding to his existing role as president.

In 1982, Legg Mason Fund Adviser, Inc. was established to manage the company’s flagship fund, Legg Mason Value Trust.

In 1983, the company became a public company via an initial public offering on the New York Stock Exchange, raising $14 million.

In 1997, the company moved its headquarters to 100 Light Street in Baltimore.

In July 2002, the company sold its stockbrokerage subsidiary to Raymond James Financial.

In 2005, the company transferred its Private Client and Capital Markets business to Citigroup in exchange for Citigroup’s asset management business in a $3.7 billion transaction, turning Legg Mason into the 5th largest money management firm in the U.S.

In 2006, fund manager Bill Miller's streak of beating the S&P 500 15 years in a row ended.

In January 2008, Mark R. Fetting became CEO of the company, succeeding Raymond A. "Chip" Mason.

In May 2008, during the financial crisis of 2007-2008, the company reported its first quarterly loss as a public company.

In July 2009, the company moved its headquarters to Inner Harbor East, Baltimore.

In October 2009, Nelson Peltz joined the board of directors of the company after acquiring a stake.

In May 2010, the company announced layoffs of as many as 350 people.

In February 2013, Joseph A. Sullivan became CEO of the company.

In 2016, the company acquired real estate investment firm Clarion Partners, combined its hedge fund platform Permal with New York independent hedge fund investor EnTrust and purchased a minority stake in New Jersey-based Precidian Investments to boost its exchange traded funds.

In April 2019, the company ended all sports sponsorships to cut costs.

In July 2020, Franklin Templeton Investments acquired Legg Mason for $4.5 billion.

Investment affiliates

Brandywine Global
Year Founded: 1986
Year Acquired: 1997
Location: Headquartered in Philadelphia; offices in Chicago, San Francisco, Singapore, and London

Clarion Partners
Year Founded: 1982 
Year Acquired: 2016 
Location: Headquartered in New York City; offices in Baltimore, Atlanta, Boston, Dallas, London, Los Angeles, São Paulo, Seattle, and Washington, D.C.

ClearBridge Investments
Year Founded: 2005 (predecessor firms date to 1962) 
Year Acquired: 2005 (as Citigroup's asset management business) 
Location: Headquartered in New York City; offices in Baltimore, San Francisco, and Wilmington

EnTrust Global
Year Founded: 2016 (predecessor firms date back to 1997 and 1973)
Year Acquired: 2005 (as The Permal Group)
Location: Headquartered in New York; offices in Beijing, Boston, Chicago, Hong Kong, London, Paris, Singapore, and Washington, D.C.

Martin Currie
Year Founded: 1881
Year Acquired: 2014
Location: Edinburgh, Scotland

QS Investors
Year Founded: 1999
Year Acquired: 2014
Location: New York City

RARE Infrastructure
Year Founded: 2006
Year Acquired: 2015
Location: Sydney, Australia; office in Stamford, Connecticut

Royce Investment Partners
Year Founded: 1972
Year Acquired: 2001
Location: New York

Western Asset Management Company
Year Founded: 1971
Year Acquired: 1986
Location: Headquartered in Pasadena, California; offices in New York City, London, Hong Kong, Melbourne, São Paulo, Singapore, Dubai, and Tokyo

Former offices

References

External links

1899 establishments in Maryland
1980s initial public offerings
2020 mergers and acquisitions
Companies formerly listed on the New York Stock Exchange
Financial services companies established in 1899
Financial services companies disestablished in 2020
Financial services companies based in Maryland
Investment management companies of the United States
Defunct companies based in Baltimore
2020 disestablishments in Maryland